Stavanger Airport normally refers to Stavanger Airport, Sola

It may also refer to:
 Stavanger Airport, Forus, a former military air base and later heliport
 Stavanger Heliport, University Hospital, a medical heliport